United Nations Security Council Resolution 35, adopted on October 3, 1947, asked that the Secretary-General convene and arrange the work schedule for the committee of three arranged for in United Nations Security Council Resolution 31 as soon as possible.

The resolution passed with nine votes in favour and two abstentions from Poland and the Soviet Union.

See also
List of United Nations Security Council Resolutions 1 to 100 (1946–1953)

References
Text of the Resolution at undocs.org

External links
 

 0035
Indonesian National Revolution
 0035
 0035
1947 in Indonesia
1947 in the Netherlands
October 1947 events